Shames may refer to:
Shames Mountain Ski Area
The Shames, American rock band of 1960a
Shames (surname)

See also
Shame (disambiguation)